The 1934 Wisconsin gubernatorial election was held on November 6, 1934.

Incumbent Democratic Governor Albert G. Schmedeman was defeated by Progressive nominee Philip La Follette.

Primary elections
Primary elections were held on September 18, 1934.

Democratic primary

Candidates
Richard F. Lehmann
William B. Rubin, attorney and unsuccessful candidate for Democratic nomination for Governor in 1932
Albert G. Schmedeman, incumbent Governor

Results

Republican primary

Candidates
Howard T. Greene, dairy farmer
James N. Tittemore, U.S. Marshal and unsuccessful candidate for Republican nomination for Governor in 1918 and 1920 and Independent candidate for U.S. Senate in 1926
Fred R. Zimmerman, former Governor

Results

Progressive primary

Candidates
Philip La Follette, former Governor
Henry O. Meisel, policeman

Results

Socialist primary

Candidates
George A. Nelson, farmer and former Speaker of the Wisconsin State Assembly

Results

General election

Candidates
Major party candidates
Albert G. Schmedeman, Democratic
Howard T. Greene, Republican
Philip La Follette, Progressive

Other candidates
George A. Nelson, Socialist
Morris Childs, Independent Communist, Communist Party district organizer
Thomas W. North, Independent Prohibition, Prohibition nominee for Wisconsin's 1st congressional district in 1902
Joseph Ehrhardt, Independent Socialist Labor, Socialist Labor nominee for Governor in 1928 and 1932

The Communist, Prohibition and Socialist Labor parties were forced to run candidates as independents, as they were not recognized as legal parties due to failing to poll the required number of votes in past primary elections.

Results

References

Bibliography
 
 

1934
Wisconsin
Gubernatorial
November 1934 events